Streptomyces griseoluteus is a bacterium species from the genus of Streptomyces which has been isolated from soil in Tokyo in Japan. Streptomyces griseoluteus produces griseoluteic acid, griseolutein A and griseolutein B.

Further reading

See also 
 List of Streptomyces species

References

External links
Type strain of Streptomyces griseoluteus at BacDive -  the Bacterial Diversity Metadatabase

griseoluteus
Bacteria described in 1950